Law Enforcement Exploring, commonly referred to as Police Explorers or Police Scouts, is an American vocational education program that allows youth to explore a career in law enforcement by working with local law enforcement agencies. Founded on July 12, 1973, it is one of the Exploring programs from Learning for Life, a non-Scouting affiliate of the Boy Scouts of America. The program is generally available to qualified young adults who graduated 8th grade and are ages 14 through 21.

Organization

National 
Learning for Life (LFL) coordinates the Law Enforcement Exploring program at the national level. LFL provides resources such as advisor training, sample policies, and insurance. LFL also hosts a biannual conference and competition, the National Law Enforcement Explorer Conference.

Local 
Local Explorer programs are chartered by a local law enforcement agency. At least one officer from that agency serves as the post "Advisor". This advisor is responsible for department-level administration of the program, and ensuring that the program meets the departments objectives.

Most posts maintain a command structure mirroring that of the hosting agency.

Activities and training

Each post is unique and the activities of each depend on their specific department's policies and guidelines. Typical activities include:

Weekly or bi-monthly administrative and training
Patrol "ride-alongs" (Some Posts require the Explorers participating be 18 years or older and participate as private citizens)
Community Service
Tactical training
Honor guards
Search and Rescue (ESAR posts specialize in this)
Radio procedure (how to properly use police radios)
Arrests and use of force
Traffic stops
Building searches
Crime scene investigations
Crisis/hostage negotiations
Report writing
Domestic crises
Emergency first aid & CPR/AED/officer down
White collar crime
Active shooter response
Field intoxication tests

Since the September 11 attacks, some Explorer posts have focused their training on counter-terrorism, border patrol, drug raids, hostage negotiation, and active shooter areas, while still teaching the above listed areas.

Academy

In some areas of the country, Explorers may go to an Explorer Academy, usually consecutive weekends or week-long to receive training and discipline, similar in nature to that of a real law enforcement academy. The academy ends with a graduation ceremony where certificates (such as CPR certification) and awards are given.

Some systems may provide different levels of Academy training, such as:

Basic (Complete overview of basic law enforcement)
Advanced (with rotating topic each academy or simply more in-depth training on various topics)
Explorer Administrative Assistants ( EAA's assist in the running of academies and assist with training)
Selection (Either to prepare for a leadership position within the post or to prepare for the actual hiring process)
Academy Police Department (Explorers apply, and are selected to join the APD, this course will simulate what it is like to work for a law enforcement agency for a week, using mock scenes to challenge the Explorer)
Ride Along (Explorers learn how to safely ride alongside a police officer serving on his or her patrol shift. They learn where to stand on traffics stops and how to react in high stress situations. They are also taught when and when not to get out of the patrol car depending on the severity of the call.)

A majority of Explorer Training, including Academies are instructed by post advisers.

Activities

Public events
Public services are a chance for the Explorers to get out in public and interact with the community. Events range from crowd control at parades, to providing security and uniformed presence at events like fairs and sporting events, and directing traffic during mass traffic floods; such as those following sporting and other civic events.

Conferences and competition
Every other year, Learning for Life hosts a National Law Enforcement Explorer Conference, which includes role-playing scenarios that law enforcement officers regularly encounter, seminars, and networking opportunities.

Depending on the regional structure, explorers may compete several times annually. They perform the skills they have learned (such as traffic stops, building searches, marksmanship, arrests, etc.) usually in the form of scenarios. They are graded by judges against fellow explorers from the region, country, and sometimes world.

Awards and recognition
Explorers are eligible for awards and scholarships offered through Learning for Life, and through local and regional Explorer organizations.

Criticism

Sexual abuse
Since the mid-1970s, there have been over 100 reported cases of police officers raping Explorers, the vast majority of whom were underage. Such incidents have occurred in at least 66 police departments. Learning for Life has created a set of rules governing the Explorer program, which includes a non-fraternization policy between officers (or "adult leaders") and Explorers. However, it leaves oversight to individual departments. There are no reported cases of Learning for Life revoking a police department's ability to operate an Explorer program over failed oversight leading to one or several incidents of sexual abuse.

Post disbandments

In 2000, Los Angeles City Council voted unanimously to disband the Los Angeles Police Department's Explorer Program due to the Scouts of America's policies (at the time) prohibiting homosexual, atheist, or agnostic members, which violated city laws preventing associations with businesses that discriminate. The LAPD replaced their program with the Cadet Program in 2007.

In popular culture
In the 1971 Adam-12 episode "Pick-Up", a group of LAPD Explorers manage to apprehend a robbery suspect.

In an episode of Law and Order: Special Victims Unit, a member of the New York City Police Department Law Enforcement Explorers program jeopardizes, but then saves, a criminal case against a serial rapist.

In an episode of Blue Bloods, a group of NYPD Law Enforcement Explorers are seen attending presentations hosted by Frank and Jamie Reagan concerning the career of law enforcement.

See also
 Aviation Career Exploring
 Fire Service Exploring
 Health Career Exploring
 Explorer Search and Rescue
 Exploring

References

External links
 Law Enforcement Exploring
 Minnesota Law Enforcement Association
 Texas Law Enforcement Association
 Florida Sheriff's Explorer Association
 National Law Enforcement Explorers Forum

1973 establishments in Texas
Boy Scouts of America
Law enforcement in the United States